Inmaculada González (born 26 December 1970) is a Spanish former volleyball player who competed in the 1992 Summer Olympics.

References

1970 births
Living people
Spanish women's volleyball players
Olympic volleyball players of Spain
Volleyball players at the 1992 Summer Olympics